Theodore William Fauss (born June 30, 1961 in Clark Mills, New York) is an American former professional ice hockey defenseman. He played in the National Hockey League (NHL) for the Toronto Maple Leafs.

Career statistics

External links

References 

1961 births
Living people
American men's ice hockey defensemen
Binghamton Whalers players
Clarkson Golden Knights men's ice hockey players
Ice hockey players from New York (state)
Newmarket Saints players
Nova Scotia Voyageurs players
People from Oneida County, New York
Sherbrooke Canadiens players
Toronto Maple Leafs players
Undrafted National Hockey League players
Utica Blizzard players